Fareej el-Makharqa or Al-Makharga is a neighborhood in the heart of Manama, the capital of Bahrain. It is adjacent to Fareej el-Hammam, Fareej el-Hatab, Fareej el-Fadhel, and Gudaibiya.

History
Its name derives from the ancient craft of piercing pearls and making jewelry.

Fareej el-Makharqa holds the most important meetings of the opposition parties. Therefore, meetings of the opposing movements from all over Bahrain were held in the influential Shiite mosque Masjid Mu'min and the Sunni mosque Jami'a Al-Mihza'.

Nowadays, it is a sacred district in the old city of Manama, in which religious gatherings are held, especially during the month of Muharram and in Ashura, the sacred day of Shia Islam in which Imam Hussain, the grandson of the prophet Muhammad, was killed by the Umayyad ruler Yazid ibn Muawiyah.

Matams
Some of the matams or hussainias in Al Makharga are:

 Matam Bin Rajab, مأتم بن رجب first Matam in all of Manama
 Matam Madan مأتم مدن
 Matam Bin Zabar
 Matam Alajam Alkabeer مأتم العجم الكبير
 Matam Algassab مأتم القصاب
 Matam Bin Saloom مأتم بن سلوم
 Matam Alahsaiyeen مأتم الأحسائيين 
 Matam Aljahramiya مأتم الجهرمية
 Matam Alajah مأتم العجة
 Matam Bin Khalaf مأتم بن خلف
 Matam Dashti مأتم دشتي
 Matam AlBad'e مأتم البدع
 Matam Abu Aqlain مأتم أبو عقلين
 Matam Al Aghtam مأتم الأغتم

References

Neighborhoods of Manama